Jia Xiuquan (born 9 November 1963) is a Chinese football manager and former international player.

Player career

Club career
As a player, Jia Xiuquan predominately played the majority of his career for Bayi Football Team. During his time at Bayi, he saw them win two league titles, his first title in 1981 and his second in the 1986 league season. He would also personally win the Chinese Football Association Golden Ball award in 1983, 1984 and 1986. After achieving these honours he was one of the first Chinese players to attract interest from foreign teams. Jia would eventually transfer to Yugoslav First League team FK Partizan where he moved in 1988 together with Liu Haiguang. They were among the pioneers among Chinese players in Europe, as by then, only Xie Yuxin and Gu Guangming, playing with FC Zwolle (Netherlands) and SV Darmstadt 98 (Germany) respectively, had been playing in Europe since 1987.

Jia and Liu came to Belgrade during the winter break of the 1987–88 season. Jia played 10 matches in the league during the second half of the 1987–88 season, with Partizan finishing second that season one point behind their eternal rivals Red Star. He played one of the matches On 26 October 1988, Jia played in the 1988–89 UEFA Cup second round first leg against Italian giants AS Roma, coming on as a substitute for Fadil Vokrri in the 46th minute, which made him the first Chinese footballer to play in the UEFA Cup. Partizan beat Roma 4–2 at home, but later they lost 0–2 in Italian capital, making it an away-goals loss. That domestic season, the 1988–89 Yugoslav First League, the league had a surprising winner, FK Vojvodina, with Partizan finishing in a disappointing 6th position, however the club compensated by winning the Yugoslav Cup that year, with Jia playing in two Cup matches. In the league that season Jia played 6 matches. In total, along with the 11 friendlies where he scored one goal, with Partizan Jia played a total of 34 matches having scored one goal.

Afterward Jia will move to Malaysian club Malaysia Royal Police FA. He was invited to Japanese outfit Sanfrecce Hiroshima by Kazuo Imanishi in 1992; however, he chose Matsushita Electric at the recommendation of club's assistant coach Chi Shangbin. He played in the 1991–92 Japan Soccer League with the club finishing in 5th place at the end of the season. Jia played with Gamba Osaka in the inaugural season of the J.League in 1993 and he made 25 league appearances during that season, with Gamba Osaka finishing in 7th place. Jia was the first ever Chinese player to play in the J.League.

International career
In 1982, he would make his debut for the Chinese national team, however he would rise to prominence in the 1984 AFC Asian Cup where China finished runners up and Jia was personally named as the Asian Cup Most Valuable Player. A constant regular within the team Jia would captain the team from 1987 until 1992 where he led China in an unsuccessful FIFA World Cup qualifying campaign as well as the 1988 and 1992 AFC Asian Cup, eventually achieving 55 caps for his country. He was also part of the Chinese team at the 1988 Summer Olympics.

Management career

Early management career
After he retired, Bayi Football Team offered Jia a chance to rejoin them and coach them for a short period, however his presence within the team was unable to lift them from a spending much of the season near the bottom of the league. With Shaanxi Guoli, Jia managed a newly formed team starting at the bottom of the Chinese league system and would lead them to promotion to the second tier in the 1997 league season. This caught the attention of the Chinese Football Association and offered him the China national under-17 football team, however his reign with them was uninspired and the team were unable to qualify for any major tournaments.

Chinese youth teams
In 2000 Shanghai Shenhua were willing to give Jia a chance to join them as a trainer before Bayi asked Jia to join them again. Once again he spent much of his time trying to keep Bayi in the top tier of the league system. However, despite achieving this he left them at the end of the 2002 league season where they finished a disappointing 13th. Jia would later accept a position for the China national under-23 football team however this was short lived and he resigned in February 2004. Once again he took another training position with Shanghai but because English Head Coach Howard Wilkinson resigned before the start of the beginning of the league season Jia acted as the head coach through the majority of the season, Shanghai ultimately ended the season finishing 10th. In 2005 Jia returned to the Chinese under-23 team as a permanent manager to compete for the Football at the 2008 Summer Olympics – Men's tournament.

Shanghai Shenhua
At the beginning of the 2008 league season Henan Jianye offered Jia the chance to manage them in the top tier, Jia took this position but had a poor start to the season and was replaced with Acácio Casimiro. In September 2008 Jia was again offered the chance to manage Shanghai Shenhua, this time on a permanent basis and took Shanghai to second in the league. At the end of the 2009 Jia was dismissed by the club again after a disappointing season with the team ranking 5th. Later he was reported to be arrested for receiving bribes during his stint at Chinese youth team.

Allegations of match-fixing
On 20 January 2010, Jia was arrested and questioned on allegations of match-fixing during his tenures with Shaanxi Guoli and the Chinese youth teams. His character would be questioned by the Chinese media and old stories about his coaching abilities, his cozy relationship with the Chinese FA, criticisms from former players and staff as well as his willingness to allow Shanghai Shenhua's chairman Zhu Jun's to interference on team management would all be recycled during his arrest. On 21 January 2010 Chinese FA member Yang Yimin was also arrested on allegations of match-fixing. The allegations against each men would expose an extremely close friendship between Jia and Yang Yimin especially during their time working with each other with the Chinese youth teams. On 4 March 2010, Jia was released from prison and had all allegations against him dropped. Yang Yimin would later be found guilty for his involvement in a match-fixing ring that saw him sentenced to 10 years in prison on 18 February 2012.

Henan Jianye
On 2 June 2014, Jia was appointed as the new manager of Henan Jianye.

Career statistics

Club statistics

International

International goals

Honours 
Bayi
National League Division 1: 1981, 1986
Partizan
Yugoslav Cup: 1988–89

China
1984 AFC Asian Cup: Silver Medal

Individual
Chinese Jia-A League Golden Ball: 1983, 1984, 1986
AFC Asian Cup MVP: 1984
AFC Asian Cup top scorer: 1984

References

External links
 

 

1963 births
Living people
Footballers from Dalian
Chinese footballers
Association football forwards
Bayi Football Team players
FK Partizan players
PDRM FA players
Gamba Osaka players
Yugoslav First League players
Japan Soccer League players
J1 League players
Asian Games competitors for China
Olympic footballers of China
China international footballers
1984 AFC Asian Cup players
Footballers at the 1986 Asian Games
Footballers at the 1988 Summer Olympics
Footballers at the 1990 Asian Games
1992 AFC Asian Cup players
Chinese expatriate footballers
Chinese expatriate sportspeople in Yugoslavia
Chinese expatriate sportspeople in Malaysia
Chinese expatriate sportspeople in Japan
Expatriate footballers in Yugoslavia
Expatriate footballers in Malaysia
Expatriate footballers in Japan
Chinese football managers
Shanghai Shenhua F.C. non-playing staff
Shanghai Shenhua F.C. managers
Henan Songshan Longmen F.C. managers
Chinese Super League managers
China women's national football team managers
2019 FIFA Women's World Cup managers